Bhetua is a village in Amethi tehsil of Amethi district, Uttar Pradesh, India. As of 2011, it has a population of 1,680 people, in 260 households. It has one primary school and no healthcare facilities and does not host a weekly haat or permanent market. Bhetua serves as the headquarters of a community development block, which includes 71 rural villages as well as the census town of Korwa. It also serves as the headquarters of a nyaya panchayat that also includes 14 other villages.

The 1951 census recorded Bhetua (as "Bhetwa Mafi") as comprising 20 hamlets, with a total population of 1,148 people (559 male and 589 female), in 248 households and 238 physical houses. The area of the village was given as 747 acres. 100 residents were literate, all male. The village was listed as belonging to the pargana of Amethi and the thana of Raipur.

The 1961 census recorded Bhetua (as "Bhetuwa Muafi") as comprising 14 hamlets, with a total population of 1,231 people (571 male and 660 female), in 252 households and 243 physical houses. The area of the village was given as 747 acres.

The 1981 census recorded Bhetua (as "Bhetuwa") as having a population of 1,747 people, in 338 households, and having an area of 307.57 hectares. The main staple foods were listed as wheat and rice.

The 1991 census recorded Bhetua (as "Bhetuwa") as having a total population of 2,067 people (1,052 male and 1,015 female), in 380 households and 375 physical houses. The area of the village was listed as 208.00 hectares. Members of the 0-6 age group numbered 372, or 18% of the total; this group was 49% male (183) and 51% female (189). Members of scheduled castes numbered 399, or 19% of the village's total population, while no members of scheduled tribes were recorded. The literacy rate of the village was 48% (629 men and 186 women, counting only people age 7 and up). 644 people were classified as main workers (491 men and 153 women), while 59 people were classified as marginal workers (all women); the remaining 1,364 residents were non-workers. The breakdown of main workers by employment category was as follows: 297 cultivators (i.e. people who owned or leased their own land); 239 agricultural labourers (i.e. people who worked someone else's land in return for payment); 0 workers in livestock, forestry, fishing, hunting, plantations, orchards, etc.; 0 in mining and quarrying; 23 household industry workers; 9 workers employed in other manufacturing, processing, service, and repair roles; 1 construction worker; 28 employed in trade and commerce; 0 employed in transport, storage, and communications; and 47 in other services.

Villages
Bhetua CD block has the following 71 villages:

References

Villages in Amethi district
Community development blocks in India